This page covers all relevant details regarding PFC Cherno More Varna for all official competitions inside the 2007-08 season. These are A PFG, Bulgarian Cup and Intertoto Cup.

Transfers

Summer transfer window 

In:

Out:

Winter transfer window 

In:

Out:

2007-08 Squad

|}

Management
 Manager: Nikola Spasov
 Assistant Managers: Velizar Popov
 Goalkeeping Coach: Krasimir Kolev
 Fitness Coach: Veselin Markov
 Medic: Metin Mutlu

Administration
 President: Marin Mitev
 Vicepresident: Nikolay Nikolaev
 General Manager: Marin Marinov
 Marketing Director: Mihail Statev
 Press Officer: Krasimir Nikolov

Matches

A PFG
Kick-off listed in local time (EET)

League table

Results summary

League performance

Bulgarian Cup
Kick-off listed in local time (EET)

Intertoto Cup
Kick-off listed in local time

Footnotes

See also

PFC Cherno More Varna seasons
Cherno More Varna